Balboa Boulevard is a major north–south street in the city of Los Angeles, and it cuts through many communities and is one of the main thoroughfares in the San Fernando Valley.

The southern end of Balboa Boulevard starts at Ventura Boulevard in the Encino section of Los Angeles.  From there, it passes under the 101 Freeway, goes through a portion of the Sepulveda Dam Recreation Area, and runs through the communities of Lake Balboa, Van Nuys, Northridge, North Hills, and Granada Hills.

As Balboa Boulevard passes through Granada Hills, it crosses the 118 Freeway before ending at Foothill Boulevard.

Metro Local lines 235 & 236 runs along Balboa Boulevard.  The G Line serves a station at its intersection with Victory Boulevard in Lake Balboa.

References

https://web.archive.org/web/20110713182255/http://lalife.com/address/6934_Balboa_Blvd_Los_Angeles_CA_91406
http://www.chow.com/places/7911
https://web.archive.org/web/20110711161841/http://www.hellolosangeles.com/business_profile/11163850_75/conroy_s_flowers.cfm

Streets in Los Angeles
Streets in the San Fernando Valley
Boulevards in the United States
Encino, Los Angeles
Granada Hills, Los Angeles
Lake Balboa, Los Angeles
Van Nuys, Los Angeles
Sylmar, Los Angeles